Pat Ward Williams (born 1948) is an African-American photographer whose work often engages with the complexities of race, gender, and history. In addition to her smaller-scale photographs and installations, she has designed three public artworks in Los Angeles.

Williams holds a BFA from Moore College of Art and Design (1982) and an MFA from the Maryland Institute College of Art (1987).

Work
One of Williams’ best known works is Accused/Blowtorch/Padlock (1986), which consists of an image of a black man tied to a tree (originally published in Life magazine in 1937 and not attributed to a specific photographer), surrounded by text expressing the artist's reaction to this image.

Accused/Blowtorch/Padlock has been included in exhibitions such as The Decade Show, a large-scale collaborative exhibition by the New Museum, Studio Museum in Harlem, and The Museum of Contemporary Hispanic Art, as well as in Art, Women, California 1950–2000: Parallels and Intersections at the San Jose Museum of Art.

Williams was part of the Photo-Active Feminist Visiting Artists 1998–99 Series, sponsored by the National Endowment for the Arts and the University of Michigan School of Art and Design and Women's Studies Program. The group of artists, which also included Paula Allen, Barbara Kruger, Susan Meiselas, Connie Samaras, Kathy Constantinides, Wendy Ewald, and Marilyn Zimmerman, were chosen for their engagement with social and political issues in their work and traveled to the University of Michigan to present their work to students and the community.

In 1992, Williams published the exhibition catalog Probable Cause, which contained a series of photographs shown at the Goldie Paley Gallery at Moore College of Art and Design.

Themes 
In Williams Accused/Blowtorched/Padlock work she is able to create a direct view and message through her use of text and visual aid alongside the original image of the torture. Williams enlarges certain aspects of the original image and encases them in an old window frame- like border to bring the viewer to a truly witness what is happening in the photograph.

Williams has explained her intent in the work and how that relates to the title of the piece: “I force the viewer to look at what is really going on by dissecting the important body of information and by directing with text what the viewer should notice: the tied hands (accused), the scarred back (blowtorch), and the lock, chain, and tree (padlock).” Art historian Dora Apel has argued that in including the text of her own response to the image, Williams "attempts to define for the viewer the relationship between violence, spectacle, and public representation."

Public art
Williams has also created three public artworks in Los Angeles. In 1995, she designed The Emperor of the Great 9th District, a memorial to Gilbert Lindsay installed at the Los Angeles Convention Center. The monument consists of three 10-foot high, triple-sided concrete pillars featuring a portrait of Lindsay at his desk. When viewers move closer, they see that the large image of Lindsay is made up of 104 smaller tiles that contain additional images of Lindsay with his family, staff, and other public figures, including Martin Luther King Jr.

Williams’ 2001 work Starbursts decorates the Hollywood and Highland Center. Inspired by the finale dance scene of Busby Berkeley’s 1934 film Dames, Williams created circular images that mimic the camera angles in the film. The photo-etched images are on black granite and can be seen on the upper and lower entrance plaza floors of the Dolby Theatre.

In 2003, Williams created the public artwork Everyday People for the Lake metro station in Los Angeles. The work consists of large photographs of local people mounted on colored glass panels.

Teaching
Williams has taught photography at UC Irvine and as a visiting professor at the University of Hawaii at Manoa and Technikon Witwatersrand, in Johannesburg. She teaches at Florida State University, where she has worked since 2000.

Personal
Williams' daughter, Janaya Williams, is a radio producer at National Public Radio in Washington, DC.

References

American women photographers
African-American photographers
Living people
Florida State University faculty
Moore College of Art and Design alumni
Maryland Institute College of Art alumni
American photographers
1948 births
Date of birth missing (living people)
American women academics
21st-century African-American people
21st-century African-American women
20th-century African-American people
20th-century African-American women